Fradswell is a village in Staffordshire, England, approximately 7 miles (10 km) north-east of the town of Stafford and  north of Colwich. Fradwell was first mentioned as part of the Colwich parish in the Domesday Book, where it is listed as Frodawelle or Frodeswelle, and it is likely to have been an Anglian settlement established during the Dark Ages.

The village received a church of its own in the 13th century, when the Chapel of Saint James The Less was established. The chancel survives, but the main part of the church was rebuilt in 1764. Fradswell became a parish in its own right in February 1851 (it has since become the Milwich with Fradswell Parish), and further refurbishment, including the building of a new nave and the installation of stained glass by William Wailes, followed soon after.

Fradswell in 2021 is a thriving rural village of 175 people, embracing inclusiveness, sustainability, enabling, localness and tradition as its values. In 2015, after huge amounts of work by the community, Fradswell was awarded a Big Lottery grant of £450,000 to demolish the old 1924 wooden village hall, and rebuild a new, fit-for-purpose community hub. This new hall was opened by the children of the village in 2016. Fradswell now has a wonderful hall, and a community Serenity Garden all set within the newly sited Village Green. A wonderful place to meet and socialise.

Fradswell hosts 2 very popular annual events. 

In September, Frapfest! the Fradswell Apple festival - where locals exchange their apples for Fradswell cider and the donated apples are chopped and pressed to produce fresh apple juice, most of which is turned into Fradswell Cider over the Autumn. It’s a great community day with folk of all ages joining in.
In January, it’s the Fradswell Wassail! A spectacular evening event with flaming torches, banging of instruments and music at which the community ‘wake the apple trees’ in expectation of a good summer crop. A lovely family event. 

Fradswell Community Hub also run regular monthly Coffee Mornings, Pop Up Bar and a highly successful monthly Lunch Club as well as other community events throughout the year.

See also
Listed buildings in Fradswell

References

Villages in Staffordshire